Stussenia is a genus of flowering plants belonging to the family Melastomataceae.

Its native range is Vietnam.

Species:
 Stussenia membranifolia (Li) C.Hansen

References

Melastomataceae
Melastomataceae genera